Colchicum parlatoris is a small species of flowering plant native to Greece. It has dark-purple pink flowers on short stems bearing prominent yellow stamens.  The species is very similar to Colchicum pusillum.

References

parlatoris
Plants described in 1876
Flora of Greece